God Macabre is a Swedish death metal band. They were formed in the winter of 1988 as a grindcore band named Botten På Burken. In 1989 they switched to playing death metal and changed their name to Macabre End. Jonas Stålhammar joined the band in the spring of 1990 and took over most of the songwriting (music). They released a demo in September 1990 titled Consumed by Darkness which turned into an underground hit. Thereafter they changed their name once again to God Macabre. In 1992 the band split up, after Johansson and Nilsson had left the band in 1991, and no suitable replacements could be found. Boder and Sjöberg formed the band Snake Machine which evolved into Space Probe Taurus. After the split-up the only album recorded was released - The Winterlong.... The album was re-issued in 2002 with the demo as bonus tracks by Relapse Records. In March 2008 the Relapse version of the album was also released on vinyl for the first time by the Swedish label Bloodharvest Records. May 2014 saw a second re-release of The Winterlong... by Relapse Records this time with added bonus track "Life's Verge", an old song from 1991 that was not recorded until 2013.

Discography
 Consumed by Darkness (demo, September 1990) - as Macabre End
 The demo was remixed and released as a 7" in June 1991.
 The Winterlong... (Recorded December 1991, Released December 1993)
 Eve Of Souls Forsaken (Live Album, Recorded September 1991, Released 2010)

Members
Current members
Per Boder - Vocals (1991-1992, 2013–present)
Ola Sjöberg - Guitars (1991-1992, 2013–present)
Jonas Stålhammar - Guitars, Bass (1991-1992), Guitars (2013-present)
Björn Larsson - Bass (2013–present)
Tobias Gustafsson - Drums (2013–present)

Former members
Niklas Nilsson - Drums (1991)
Tomas Johansson - Bass (1991)

References

External links
 Facebook page

Swedish death metal musical groups
Relapse Records artists
Musical groups established in 1988
Musical groups disestablished in 1992